RAF Perton is a former Royal Air Force Relief Landing Ground (RLG) located in Perton, Staffordshire, England.

It was open between 1941 and 1946 and was built on the site of a former First World War airfield. The village of Perton now occupies the site of the former airfield.

History

The site was first used by No 38 Squadron between 1916 and 1918. It was abandoned after the First World War but was used sporadically for non-military flying (usually air displays). Shortly after the outbreak of the Second World War the construction of the airfield began in the typical triangular pattern with three runways (two of 1,100 yards and one of 1,400 yards) using ash from Lower Gornal and stone from Oldbury with the intention of Perton becoming a fighter station which is evident by the number of fighter pen dispersals situated around the perimeter track. However Perton instead became a relief landing ground for use by other airfields most notably RAF Wheaton Aston when No. 21 (P)AFU was established there.
 
The following units were based at RAF Perton at some point:

 No. 5 (Pilots) Advanced Flying Unit RAF ((P) AFU).
 No. 38 Squadron RAF, 1916-17
 RLG for No. 11 Flying Training School between January 1942 and 14 March 1942.
 RLG for No. 11 (Pilots) Advanced Flying Unit between 4 August 1942 and 1 August 1943.
 RLG for No. 21 (Pilots) Advanced Flying Unit between 1 August 1943 and 16 July 1946.

The airfield was used by two civilian locally based companies. Both Helliwells (Walsall) and Boulton-Paul (Wolverhampton) had air testing areas of their own, but these were too small for the larger aircraft and so used Perton when aircraft needed to be finished or for when they were being serviced.

The Princess Wilhelmina Brigade of the Dutch Army trained here and later took part in the liberation of their country.

In August 1946, the airfield and its associated buildings were put under the Care and Maintenance programme after the last Airspeed Oxfords of N0. 21 (P)AFU left in the previous month. In 1947 RAF Perton was abandoned and given to the Agricultural Land Commission with the Dutch camp becoming a refuge camp for Poles, Latvians and Lithuanians until 1950 when it was converted to housing and occupied until 1962.

Current use

The idea of turning the area over to housing was first mooted in 1963, although the initial scheme was rejected. In 1972, the Mander family sold the site of the airfield to a private developer for £5.5 million, with the first houses being occupied within a couple of years and Perton being firmly established as a major residential area by the 21st century, by which time some 12,000 people were living there.

A Memorial in honour of all who trained here – many of whom gave their lives during the war – and remnants of air raid shelters which can still be found in the surrounding woodland.

Notes

References

Bibliography

External links

Perton
Perton
Wolverhampton